The Be'eri Forest of area about 11,000 dunams is located in the western Negev, within the Eshkol Regional Council area. In was planted by the pioneers of the kibbutz Be'eri.

Tourist attractions
Be'eri Badlands Nature Reserve 
ANZAC Memorial
Abandoned 


Other tourist attractions include water cisterns and wells from the Byzantine period and extensive ammunition depots from the British Mandate period.

During the winter season a major attraction of the area is the anemone  blooming, which peaks on the break of January/February. Luckily, the anemones were not damaged during the Palestinian airborne arson attacks, from which other area of the forest, including the Be'eri Badlands, heavily suffered.

References

Forests of Israel
Eshkol Regional Council